Linden Assembly was a General Motors automobile factory in Linden, New Jersey, United States.  The plant operated from 1937 to 2005 and made cars, trucks and SUVs for various GM automotive divisions. Engine block and cylinder heads were cast at Saginaw Metal Casting Operations, internal engine components were created at Bay City Powertrain and the engines were then assembled at assembled at Tonawanda Engine and Romulus Engine.

History
The  factory opened in 1937 to build Buick, Pontiac, Cadillac, and Oldsmobile vehicles from "knock down kits". During World War II, the plant was also used to produce fighter planes for the United States military, primarily the FM Wildcat, an improved version of the F4F Wildcat, as it is adjacent to the Linden Airport. After automobile production resumed, it was under the management of GM's newly created Buick-Oldsmobile-Pontiac Assembly Division created in 1945.

By the 1970s, the plant was producing luxury models from Buick, Cadillac, and Oldsmobile.  In the mid-1980s, the factory was retooled to produce the new L-body Chevrolet Beretta and Corsica.

Beginning in September 1991, the facility was idled and retooled for truck and sport utility vehicle assembly. The workers who accepted a severance package were pleased to leave, whereas the staying workers were displeased.

After reopening in 1993, it produced the Chevrolet S-10, GMC Sonoma, Chevrolet Blazer, and GMC Jimmy models. In February 2002, GM announced plans to shut down the plant in 2004, though the closure date changed after negotiations with the state government and union.  A white 2005 Blazer was the last vehicle to leave the line on April 20, 2005.

In July 2007, GM and the City of Linden settled numerous tax appeals going back to 1983; Linden agreed to pay GM $4.8 million, which cleared the way for the sale and subsequent redevelopment of the  site. The property was sold for $77 million on February 1, 2008 to Duke Realty, which redeveloped the facility as an industrial and retail site called Legacy Commerce Center.  Most of the former factory structures were demolished by August 2008.

Vehicles produced

Cars 

 1959-1964 Buick Electra
 1979-1985 Buick Riviera
 Cadillac Series 61
 Cadillac Series 62
 1959-1978 Cadillac de Ville series
 1965-1976 Cadillac Calais
 1979-1985 Cadillac Eldorado
 1980-1985 Cadillac Seville
 1987-1991 Chevrolet Beretta
 1987-1991 Chevrolet Corsica
 1958-1970 Pontiac Bonneville
 1959-1970 Pontiac Catalina
 1962-1967 Pontiac Grand Prix
 Pontiac Star Chief
 ?-1970 Pontiac Executive
 Oldsmobile 98
 1979-1985 Oldsmobile Toronado

Trucks and SUVs 
 1995-2005 Chevrolet Blazer
 1994-2004 Chevrolet S-10
 1995-2005 GMC Jimmy
 1994-2004 GMC Sonoma

References 

General Motors factories
Former motor vehicle assembly plants
Motor vehicle assembly plants in New Jersey
Companies based in Union County, New Jersey
Linden, New Jersey
1937 establishments in New Jersey
2005 disestablishments in New Jersey